Taichlech mac Maelruanaid Ó Dubhda (died 1282) was King of Uí Fiachrach Muaidhe.

References
 The History of Mayo, Hubert T. Knox, p. 379, 1908.
 Araile do fhlathaibh Ua nDubhda/Some of the princes of Ui Dhubhda, pp. 676–681, Leabhar na nGenealach:The Great Book of Irish Genealogies, Dubhaltach Mac Fhirbhisigh (died 1671), eag. Nollaig Ó Muraíle, 2004-05, De Burca, Dublin.

Annalistic references
 1278. Brian O'Dowda and Art na g-Capall of the Horses O'Hara, Lord of Leyny, gave battle to the Clann-Feorais Birminghams, in which the Clann-Feorais were defeated, and the two sons of Meyler More, Conor Roe Mac Feorais, and others besides, were slain.
 1281. A battle was fought between the Barretts and the Cusack, in which the Barretts were defeated, and William Barrett, Adam Fleming, and many others, were slain. There were assisting the Cusack in this battle two of the Irish, namely, Taichleach O'Boyle and Taichleach O'Dowda, who surpassed all that were there in bravery and valour, and in agility and dexterity at shooting.
 1282. Taichleach, son of Mulrony O'Dowda, Lord of Tireragh, the most hospitable and warlike of his tribe in his time, was slain by Adam Cusack on the strand of Traigh Eothaile.

External links
 UCC page

Monarchs from County Mayo
People from County Sligo
13th-century Irish monarchs
1282 deaths
Year of birth unknown